Robert Barry Daroff (born 1936) is a pioneer of ocular motor research. He is a neurologist in Cleveland, Ohio, connected to University Hospitals Cleveland Medical Center. He is also Professor and Chair Emeritus of Neurology at Case Western Reserve University School of Medicine.

Early life and education 
Daroff was born in New York City.  His father was Charlie Daroff, one of four brothers who owned H. Daroff and Sons, a Philadelphia company that manufactured Botany 500 clothing. When Daroff was ten years old he left public school and attended the Riverside Military Academy in Gainesville, Georgia. At the age of 16 he enrolled at the University of Chicago, but after one year transferred to the University of Pennsylvania, to be closer to home. While at the University of Chicago he was roommates with Carl Sagan. After graduating in 1957 Daroff attended medical school at the University of Pennsylvania and graduated in 1961.

Career 
Daroff served in the United States Army Medical Corps from 1965 until 1967, attaining the rank of captain. He was on the faculty of the Departments of Neurology and Ophthalmology at the University of Miami from 1968 to 1980.  While in Miami, he began to study the trajectories of normal and abnormal eye movements with Louis Dell'Osso and other experts in systems control. He was the editor-in-chief of  the medical journal Neurology from 1987 to 1997. He served as president of the American Neurological Association and the American Headache Society.  He treated several members of the royal families in Saudi Arabia and other Persian Gulf states. He is a founder of the Rocky Mountain Neuro-Ophthalmology Society, the forerunner of the North American Neuro-Ophthalmology Society (NANOS).

References 

1936 births
Living people
American neurologists
Case Western Reserve University faculty
University of Chicago alumni
Perelman School of Medicine at the University of Pennsylvania alumni
United States Army Medical Corps officers
University of Miami faculty
Medical journal editors
People from New York City